Román Ariznavarreta was a Spanish actor and stuntman.

Born in Madrid on December 15, 1932
He appeared in the Spaghetti Western films For a Few Dollars More (1965) and The Good, the Bad and the Ugly (1966), directed by Sergio Leone. He was a stuntman with Pablo Garcia in Hurricane (1979), directed by Jan Troell. He also appeared in Spanish films such as El Lute: camina o revienta (1987), directed by Vicente Aranda.

Filmography

Films

Television
 Socrates (1971, TV Movie) as Calicle (uncredited)
 Curro Jiménez (1977)
 Los desastres de la guerra (1983)
 Celia (1993)
 El síndrome de Ulises (2007) as Matón

References

External links
 

Date of birth unknown
20th-century Spanish male actors
21st-century Spanish male actors
Spanish male television actors
Spanish male film actors
Male actors from Madrid
Male Spaghetti Western actors